Outjo (Otjiherero: small hills) is a city of 6,000 inhabitants in the Kunene Region of Namibia. It is the district capital of Outjo Constituency. It is best known as a main gateway to Etosha National Park.

Overview 

The town was founded by Germans under the command of Colonel Theodor von Leutwein in 1897 as a small military base in order to explore the northern area of German South West Africa. The local historical museum (Franke Haus Museum) details the campaign of Major Viktor Franke in Ovamboland.

The "Naulila monument" commemorates the small expedition on the Portuguese fort of Naulila in Angola by Major Viktor Franke in October 1914 following the massacre of a German delegation which had been sent to negotiate a treaty of non-aggression. it is one of the fast developing town in the Kunene Region.

South of Outjo is the Ugab River, one of the major rivers of Namibia. The town lies near Gamkarab Cave, known for its stalactites and stalagmites and its pietersite. The caves are on private ground and not open to the public.

Politics
Outjo is governed by a municipal council that has seven seats.

Since the independence of the country, Outjo is the only small town in Kunene controlled by the ruling party "SWAPO". The 2015 local authority election was won by SWAPO which gained four seats (1,307 votes). Two seats went to the United Democratic Front (UDF, 706 votes), and the  remaining seat was won by the Democratic Turnhalle Alliance (DTA) with 381 votes. SWAPO also won the 2020 local authority election but lost majority control over the municipal council. It obtained 872 votes and three seats. One seat each went to the Landless People's Movement (LPM, a new party registered in 2018, 501 votes), the UDF (392 votes), the Popular Democratic Movement (PDM, the new name of the DTA, 307 votes), and the Monitor Action Group (MAG, 161 votes).

Transport 
Damaraland is also reached by travelling through Outjo on the C39 to Khorixas, and the C40 towards Kamanjab leads to the Kaokoveld.

Outjo has an airstrip about  out of town that accommodates small fixed-winged planes. Outjo is the terminus of a branch railway of the Namibian railway system, but there is no railway service .

Schools 
Immediately in Outjo are three primary schools and two secondary schools as well as a combined private school with a total of 2634 students and 96 teachers (as of December 2009).
 Jack Francis Primary School
 Maarssen Primary School 
 Outjo Primary School
 Moria Private School
 Etoshapoort Junior Secondary School
 Outjo Secondary School

The following schools are located in the vicinity of the city:
  Otjikondo School Village & Primary School (about 85 kilometers northwest of the city)
  St. Michael Roman-Catholic Primary School (about 70 kilometers northwest of the city)

Tourist attractions 

Outjo offers some sights, but it is above all an important tourist transit and supply point. In 2006, more than 22,000 tourists were counted per month.

 Franke-Haus-Museum
 Naulila monument
 The Water Tower Outjo, which was originally equipped with a wooden wind turbine, was used for water extraction.

Near the city is fingerlike rock formation created through erosion called Vingerklip (its mostly used Afrikaans name).

References 

Cities in Namibia
Populated places established in 1897
1897 establishments in German South West Africa
Populated places in the Kunene Region